Satyrium erectum is a species of orchid endemic to southwestern and Western Cape province.

References 

erectum
Endemic orchids of South Africa